Lost Girl is a Canadian supernatural drama television series that aired on Showcase for five seasons, from September 12, 2010, to October 25, 2015. It follows the life of a bisexual succubus named Bo, played by Anna Silk, as she learns to control her superhuman abilities, help those in need, and discover the truth about her origins. 

The series was created by Michelle Lovretta and produced by Jay Firestone and Prodigy Pictures Inc., with the participation of the Canadian Television Fund (Canada Media Fund), and in association with Shaw Media.

Following good ratings and positive reviews, it was renewed for a second season on November 12, 2010 (two months after its premiere), and the episodes order afterwards increased to 22 episodes; a third season on December 9, 2011; a fourth season on February 28, 2013; and a fifth on February 27, 2014. On August 25, 2014, Showcase announced that the fifth season would be the last, with the original 13-episode order increased to 16 final episodes and the season divided into two parts. 

In Australia, Lost Girl premiered on Sci Fi Australia on July 14, 2011. In the United Kingdom (UK and Ireland), it premiered on Syfy on September 1, 2011. In the United States, it premiered on Syfy on January 16, 2012,  after Syfy purchased the rights to the first 26 episodes from Prodigy Pictures Inc. on May 18, 2011.

Total episode running time is 44:00 minutes, including opening title sequence and fade to black closing credits roll. Episodes broadcast on Syfy in the United States were 90 seconds shorter to allow for more commercial advertisement time. Starting with Season 3, 30 seconds that would have otherwise been cut from the Syfy episodes were preserved by substituting the original opening title sequence with opening credits superimposed over the first scene of each episode.

Series overview

Episodes

Season 1 (2010)

Season 2 (2011–12)

Season 3 (2013)

Season 4 (2013–14)

Season 5 (2014–15)

Motion comics 
As part of the show's promotion, a series of motion comics, Lost Girl: The Interactive Motion Comic, was released on the official Lost Girl website.  The first of these appeared on August 20, 2010. The plan was to release one chapter per month, for a total of six, during the Fall 2010 television season. Around the time of the release of No. 5, the individual chapters were made available for downloading as well as being watchable on the Lost Girl website. File formats included M4V, MP4 and WMV files. It used elements of traditional print comic books with animation and audio effects. Called a motion comic by the producers, it provided a story-telling medium which was hoped would provide information about Bo and other characters from the show, and give additional insight into the supernatural world of Lost Girl.

Webisodes 
A series of four webisodes were created as a promotional lead-in to the premiere of Season Four on Showcase, with the first installment released on October 13, 2013.

Notes

References

External links 
 
 Lost Girl at  Syfy (U.S.) 
  Lost Girl at Prodigy Pictures Inc.  
 Lost Girl at Canadian Television Fund  
 
 
 Lost Girl list of episodes at Garn's Guides
 Lost Girl at BO SERIES INC. (Giant Ape Media)

Lists of Canadian drama television series episodes
Lists of fantasy television series episodes